Edging may refer to:

 Using an edger gardening tool
 Edging (climbing), a climbing technique
 Edging (orgasm), a form of orgasm control
 Edging (forging), an open-die forging process that concentrates material for further processing
 "Edging" (song), by Blink-182, 2022

See also
 Edge (disambiguation)